Vicyohandri Odelín Sanamé (born June 26, 1980 in Guantánamo) is a right-handed pitcher for the Cuban national baseball team and Camagüey of the Cuban National Series. Nicknamed "Villo", Odelín was part of the Cuban team at the 2006 World Baseball Classic.

References

External links
 

1980 births
Living people
Olympic baseball players of Cuba
Olympic gold medalists for Cuba
Olympic silver medalists for Cuba
Olympic medalists in baseball
Medalists at the 2004 Summer Olympics
Medalists at the 2008 Summer Olympics
Baseball players at the 2004 Summer Olympics
Baseball players at the 2008 Summer Olympics
Pan American Games gold medalists for Cuba
Baseball players at the 2003 Pan American Games
Baseball players at the 2011 Pan American Games
2006 World Baseball Classic players
Sportspeople from Guantánamo
Pan American Games bronze medalists for Cuba
Pan American Games medalists in baseball
Central American and Caribbean Games gold medalists for Cuba
Competitors at the 2006 Central American and Caribbean Games
Central American and Caribbean Games medalists in baseball
Medalists at the 2003 Pan American Games
Medalists at the 2011 Pan American Games